Matheney is a surname. Notable people with the surname include:

Alan Matheney (1950–2005), American criminal
Buster Matheney (1956–2000), American basketball player
Mary Brigid Matheney (born 1974), American politician

See also
Matheny (surname)